Cremanthodium is a large genus of flowering plants in the daisy family.

Cremanthodium is native to China and the Himalayas (India, Nepal, Bhutan, Pakistan, Myanmar, etc.).

 Species

References

Senecioneae
Asteraceae genera